Mary's River Covered Bridge is a covered bridge which crosses Marys River  northeast of Chester, Illinois. The bridge was built in 1854 as part of a plank toll road connecting Chester to Bremen; the bridge allowed agricultural products to be transported to Chester, a significant port on the Mississippi River. In the early 1870s, the toll road and the bridge were sold to Randolph County. The bridge served road traffic until 1930.

In 1936, the State of Illinois assumed ownership of the bridge in order to preserve it. The bridge is now located in a picnic area and park on the south side of Illinois Route 150. It is the only extant covered bridge in Southern Illinois.

The bridge was added to the National Register of Historic Places on December 31, 1974.

See also
List of covered bridges in Illinois

References

Covered bridges on the National Register of Historic Places in Illinois
Bridges completed in 1854
Buildings and structures in Randolph County, Illinois
National Register of Historic Places in Randolph County, Illinois
1854 establishments in Illinois
Wooden bridges in Indiana
Burr Truss bridges in the United States